Port Franklin is a small fishing village  south-east of Melbourne in Victoria, Australia. It is about 2 km inland from the coastline of Corner Inlet.

Port Franklin is situated on the banks of the Franklin River between Toora and Foster.  The river is lined with small commercial fishing boats, privately owned pleasure craft as well as commercial charter vessels. The local community maintain the public hall, playground, tennis courts and parklands.

The Post Office opened around 1902, was known as Bowen until 1910 and closed in 1993.

References

Coastal towns in Victoria (Australia)
Fishing communities in Australia
Towns in Victoria (Australia)
Shire of South Gippsland